Dendrobium milaniae (Dr. Paciencia Milan's dendrobium) is flower of the Orchid family found in Leyte, Visayas in the Philippines, where it is found growing as an epiphyte above bodies of water at elevations up to 600 metres. The plant is semi-pendulous and sympodial. Pseudobulbs are 10 cm by 2 cm; 3 to 6 green lanceolate leaves are present on the top third of the pseudobulb. Hans Fessel and Emil Lückel named this species in 1996 in Die Orchidee.

References

mulaniae
Endemic orchids of the Philippines
Flora of the Visayas
Plants described in 1996